The Indian locomotive class XD was a class of  "Mikado" type steam locomotives used on  broad gauge lines in India.

Variants
AWD: Similar design made by Baldwin Locomotive Works in the World War II period.

CWD: Similar design made by the Canadian Locomotive Company and the Montreal Loco Works. Along with AWD, the largest imported class, numerically.

See also

Rail transport in India#History
Indian Railways
Locomotives of India

References

Bibliography

Railway locomotives introduced in 1928
XD
Vulcan Foundry locomotives
Armstrong Whitworth locomotives
Škoda locomotives
NBL locomotives
2-8-2 locomotives
5 ft 6 in gauge locomotives